Eric Davanzo (born ) is an American politician who currently represents the 58th District in the Pennsylvania House of Representatives.

Early life and education
Davanzo was born in Westmoreland County, Pennsylvania to Richard and Kathleen Davanzo. He graduated from Yough High School in 1994.

Career 
Previously a carpenter, Davanzo won a special election in March 2020 to represent the 58th District in the Pennsylvania House of Representatives. He won reelection to a full term later that year, and again in 2022.

In 2020, Davanzo was among twenty-six Pennsylvania House Republicans who called for the reversal of Joe Biden's certification as the winner of Pennsylvania's electoral votes in the 2020 United States presidential election, citing false claims of election irregularities.

Personal life
Davanzo lives in Smithton, Pennsylvania with his wife Rachelle and their two daughters.

References

Republican Party members of the Pennsylvania House of Representatives
Year of birth missing (living people)
Living people
21st-century American politicians